Nach Baliye is an Indian Hindi-language celebrity dance reality television series that airs on Star Plus.

Production

Concept
The show is a competition wherein 10 television celebrity couples compete against each other. Contestants dance to a different tune, different theme and different styles every week and scores are given by the judges. Each week one couple is eliminated based on public voting and their scores.

In Season 9, the contestant ratings were changed to be on a scale from 1 to 100.

Reception
In 2012, when season 5 premiered the show did very well throughout the season. The grand premiere has gained 4.1 TRP.

Series

Season 1

Nach Baliye 1 is the first season of the dance reality show, Nach Baliye.

It started on 17 October 2005 and ended on 19 December 2005 with Sachin Pilgaonkar and Supriya Pilgaonkar as the winners. The judges were Saroj Khan, Malaika Arora Khan and Farhan Akhtar with Sangeeta Ghosh and Shabbir Ahluwalia serving as the hosts. The series was produced by SOL Productions.

Contestants
 Supriya Pilgaonkar and Sachin Pilgaonkar, winners
 Poonam Narula and Manish Goel, runners-up
 Rajeshwari Sachdev and Varun Badola, 3rd position
 Delnaaz Irani and Rajeev Paul, 4th position
 Archana Puran Singh and Parmeet Sethi, 5th position
 Shilpa Saklani and Apurva Agnihotri, 6th position
 Neeru Bajwa and Amit Sadh, 7th position
 Sai Deodhar and Shakti Anand, 8th position
 Manini Mishra and Mihir Mishra, 9th position
 Manasi Joshi Roy and Rohit Roy, 10th position

Season 2

Nach Baliye 2 is the second season of the dance reality show, Nach Baliye.

It started on 25 September 2006 and ended on 18 December 2006 with Hussain Kuwajerwala and Tina Kuwajerwala as the winners. Saroj Khan, Malaika Arora Khan and Kunal Kohli were the judges.  Sangeeta Ghosh and Shabbir Ahluwalia hosted the season. SOL Productions produced the second season as well.

Contestants
Hussain Kuwajerwala and Tina Kuwajerwala, winners
Yash Tonk and Gauri Tonk, runners-up
 Tannaz Irani and Bakhtiyaar Irani, 3rd position
Gauri Pradhan and Hiten Tejwani, 4th position
 Shweta Kawatra and Manav Gohil, 5th position
 Shweta Tiwari and Raja Choudhary, 6th position
 Gurdeep Kohli and Arjun Punj, 7th position
 Keerti Gaekwad Kelkar and Sharad Kelkar, 8th position
 Narayani Shastri and Gaurav Chopra, 9th position
 Ketki Dave and Rasik Dave, 10th position

Season 3

Nach Baliye 3 is the third season of the dance reality show, Nach Baliye.

It started on 21 September 2007 and ended on 22 December 2007 with Sanjeeda Sheikh and Aamir Ali as the winners. The judges were Vaibhavi Merchant, Isha Koppikar and David Dhawan. The winners of the second season, Hussain Kuwajerwala and Tina Kuwajerwala, hosted the show. It was produced by Diamond Pictures and moved from Star One to Star Plus. It was created by Anil Jha who was also the Showrunner for Season 3,4, and later 9.

Contestants
 Sanjeeda Sheikh and Aamir Ali, winners
 Rakhi Sawant and Abhishek Avasthi, runners-up
 Kashmera Shah and Krushna Abhishek, 3rd position
 Karan Patel and Amita Chandekar, 4th position
 Indraneil Sengupta and Barkha Sengupta, 5th position
 Sweta Keswani and Alexx O'Nell, 6th position
 Pooja Bedi and Hanif Hilal, 7th position
 Karan Grover and Kavita Kaushik, 8th position
 Vikas Sethi and Amita Sethi, 9th position
 Shakti Kapoor and Shivangi Kapoor, 10th position; quit
 Kiran Janjani and Ritu Janjani, 11th position

Season 4

Nach Baliye 4 is the fourth season of the dance reality show, Nach Baliye.

It started on 17 October 2008 and ended on 1 February 2009 with Shalin Bhanot and Dalljiet Kaur as the winners.

Sanjeeda Sheikh and Aamir Ali were the initial hosts but Sara Khan and Ali Merchant hosted in Week 5 and Hiten Tejwani and Gauri Pradhan Tejwani hosted in Week 8.

Farah Khan, Karisma Kapoor, and Arjun Rampal were the judges.

Contestants
 Shalin Bhanot and Dalljiet Kaur, winners
 Naman Shaw and Megha Gupta, runners-up
 Kapil Nirmal and Anjali Abrol, semi-finalists
 Yash Tonk and Gauri Tonk, wildcards; semi-finalists
 Vineet Raina and Tanushree Kaushal, eliminated
 Reshmi Ghosh and Amit Gupta, eliminated
 Karanvir Bohra and Teejay Sidhu, quit
 Mohit Malik and Addite Shirwaikar , eliminated
 Sudeep Sahir and Anantika Sahir, eliminated
 Mazher Sayed and Mouli Ganguly, eliminated
 Jaspal Bhatti and Savita Bhatti, eliminated
 Jatin Shah and Priya Bathija, eliminated
 Abhijeet Sawant and Shilpa Sawant, eliminated
 Chetan Hansraj and Lavinia Pereira, wildcards; eliminated

Season 5

Nach Baliye 5 is the fifth season of the dance reality show -  Nach Baliye.

It started on 29 December 2012 and ended on 23 March 2013 with Mahhi Vij and Jay Bhanushali as the winners.

Karan Wahi and Gautam Rode hosted the season. The judges were Shilpa Shetty, Sajid Khan and Terrence Lewis.

Contestants
 Jay Bhanushali and Mahi Vij, winners
 Sargun Mehta and Ravi Dubey, first runners-up
 Neelu Vaghela and Arvind Kumar, second runners-up
 Suhasi Dhami and Jaisheel Dhami, third runners-up
 Karan Mehra and Nisha Rawal, eliminated on 16 March 2013
 Charlie Chauhan and Kunwar Amarjeet Singh, eliminated on 9 March 2013
 Shefali Jariwala and Parag Tyagi, eliminated on 2 March 2013
 Dimpy Mahajan and Rahul Mahajan, eliminated on 23 February 2013
 Elena Boeva and Kushal Tandon, eliminated on 3 February 2013
 Smita Bansal and Ankush Mohla, eliminated on 27 January 2013
 Deepshikha Nagpal and Keshav Arora, eliminated on 13 January 2013

Guests
Drashti Dhami

Shriman V/s Shrimati
Nach Baliye Shriman V/s Shrimati is an extension of the Nach Baliye series, and ran in April 2013. In Shriman V/s Shrimati, the celebrity couples did not dance together but instead competed against each other. The series ended in a tie.

Gurmeet Choudhary was declared the Best Performer of the series.

Season 6

Nach Baliye 6 is the sixth season of the dance reality show, Nach Baliye.

It premiered on 9 November 2013 on Star Plus. Shilpa Shetty, Sajid Khan and Terrence Lewis were the judges and Gautam Rode and Karan Wahi hosted the season.

Rithvik Dhanjani and Asha Negi were declared as the winners of Nach Baliye Season 6 on 1 February 2014. Gurmeet Choudhary and Debina Bonnerjee were declared the runners-up.Sara Khan did a cameo dance performance in the wild card special episode along with Paras Chhabra.

Writing for Rediff.com, Paloma Sharma gave the show 2.5 stars out of 5 in its first week, stating "perhaps the hosts and the judges could keep their clothes on and refrain from excessive flirting since Nach Baliye does happen to be a 'family show'."

Contestants
 Rithvik Dhanjani and Asha Negi, winners on 1 February 2014
 Gurmeet Chaudhary and Debina Bonnerjee, first runners-up on 1 February 2014
 Ripudaman Handa and Shivangi Verma, second runners-up on 1 February 2014
 Vinod Thakur and Raksha Thakur, third runners-up on 1 February 2014
 Kiku Sharda and Priyanka Sharda (5th position), eliminated on 25 January 2014
 Raqesh Vashisth and Ridhi Dogra (6th position), eliminated
 Kanika Maheshwari and Ankur Ghai (7th position), quit on 11 January 2014
 Bruna Abdullah and Omar Herror (8th position), eliminated on 8 December 2013; re-entered as wild card entrants, eliminated on 4 January 2014
 Raju Srivastav and Shikha Raju (9th position), eliminated on 15 December 2013
 Amrapali Gupta and Yash Sinha (10th position), eliminated on 1 December 2013
 Sanjeev Seth and Lata Sabharwal (11th position), eliminated on 24 November 2013

Guests
Hina Khan
Barun Sobti
Deepika Singh
Rucha Hasabnis
Vishal Singh
Ishita Dutta
Mouni Roy
Mahek Chahal
Dharmesh Yelande
Sayantani Ghosh
Rashami Desai

Scoring chart

In this season, the scores per judge are out of 10 with the highest possible score of 30.
Red number indicates the lowest score.
Green number indicates the highest score.
 indicates the couple eliminated that week.
 indicates the returning couple that finished in the bottom three.
 indicates the returning couple that finished in the bottom two.
 indicates the winning couple.
 indicates the runner-up couple.
 indicates the third-place couple.

Season 7

Nach Baliye 7 is the seventh season of the dance reality show, Nach Baliye.

It premiered on 26 April 2015 on Star Plus. The series was produced by Ekta Kapoor and Shobha Kapoor under their banner Balaji Telefilms. The series aired from Monday to Saturday nights and on Sunday evenings. The season ended on 19 July 2015.

It was hosted by Rithvik Dhanjani and Karan Patel. Marzi Pestonji, Preity Zinta  and Chetan Bhagat were the judges.

Kunwar Amar, Karanvir Bohra, Mukti Mohan, Sargun Mehta and Salman Yusuf Khan also appeared in a special episode.

Contestants

Scoring chart

In this season, the scores per judge are out of 10 with the highest possible score of 30.
Red number indicates the lowest score.
Green number indicates the highest score.
 Eliminated
 Bottom three
 Bottom two
 Winning couple
 Runner-up couple
 Second runner-up couple

Season 8

Nach Baliye 8 is the eighth season of the dance reality show, Nach Baliye.

It premiered on 2 April 2017 on Star Plus. The show was produced by BBC Worldwide. Sonakshi Sinha, Terence Lewis and Mohit Suri were the judges. Karan Tacker and Upasana Singh were the hosts for the show. Divyanka Tripathi Dahiya and Vivek Dahiya were declared as the winners.

Contestants

Guests
 Salman Khan and Sohail Khan
 Ranbir Kapoor
 Arjun Kapoor and Shraddha Kapoor
 Arjun Kapoor and Anil Kapoor
 Sridevi
 Hrithik Roshan
 Diljit Dosanjh
 Parineeti Chopra
 Remo D'souza
 Karan Patel

Scoring chart

Red number Lowest score
Green number Highest score
 Eliminated
 Bottom two
 Winning couple
 Runner-up couple
 Second runner-up
 The scores per judge were out of 10 with the highest possible score of 30.
 The elimination was based on public votes plus the score given by judges in the previous week.

Notes

Season 9

Nach Baliye 9 is the ninth season of the dance reality show, Nach Baliye.

It premiered on 19 July 2019. Produced by Salman Khan, it was judged by Raveena Tandon & Ahmed Khan and hosted by Manish Paul & Waluscha De Sousa.

Vighnesh Pande and his puppet character 'Anna' appeared as a comic relief for episodes featuring South Indian Megastar Prabhas and another with the Bollywood celebrity Sanjay Dutt.

The season was won by Prince Narula and Yuvika Chaudhary on 3 November 2019.

Contestants

Scoring chart

 Current Couple
 Former Couple

Red number Lowest score
Green number Highest score
 Eliminated
 Bottom Two
 Winners
 Runner-ups
 Second runner-ups
 Hi5
 Unwell
 The scores per judge were out of 100. Then the average score is calculated from the scores of both judges.
 The elimination was based on public votes and the score given by judges.
 In Week 2, Rohit and Anita did not perform as Rohit was down with Jaundice so the doctor had advised rest to him. Ahmed and Raveena saved them and they advanced to the next week without nomination.
 In Week 7, Faisal & Muskaan had to quit the show as Faisal got injured.
 In Week 9, Pooja & Sandeep had to quit the show as Pooja got injured.
 In Week 11, The couples had to perform solo. Ridhima, Prince, Anuj, Shraddha and Vishal got a High 5, however both the partners had to score 50/50 to receive a High 5.
In week 12, every couple has to perform twice. In the first round they are getting marks out of 90. And the second round is battle between two couple. Whoever wins will get 10 marks & other get zero.
In Quarter Finale (Week 13) also, the couples had to perform twice. In first round, they performed with different  dance groups and got marks out of 100. The couples who received a High 5 were RoNita, NiShaan and ShAlam. In second round, they performed their usual performances (Theme-Retro )and got marks out of 100.The average of both the rounds was taken as their final score.
In Semi Finale (Week 14) also, the couples had to perform twice.

References

External links
 Nach Baliye on Hotstar

 
Balaji Telefilms television series
Star One (Indian TV channel) original programming
StarPlus original programming
2005 Indian television series debuts
Dance competition television shows
Indian dance television shows
Frames Production series
2010s Indian television series
Hindi-language television shows